On 16 August 2022, a sleeper bus coming from Lahore to Karachi on M-5 motorway caught fire after a collision with an oil tanker. As a result of the collision, the oil tanker and the bus caught fire and at least 20 people were killed and six injured in the accident. The Motorway Police had safely pulled out nine passengers from the two burning vehicles and were immediately shifted to nearby hospitals. M-5 motorway was closed for several hours at the scene of the accident.

Motorway Police officers rushed to the spot as soon as the accident was reported, local police and Rescue 1122 teams were also present at the spot. It took several hours for the rescue teams to put out the fire. On the instructions of IG Khalid Mahmood, the Motorway Police set up an emergency crisis center.

According to reports the sleeper bus had left Lahore for Karachi at 9 pm on 15 August 2022. The bus was a 2009 model operated by Daewoo Company. There were two drivers in the bus, all the staff had to change in Sukkur, and a total 24 passengers were on the bus, out of which two passengers were to going to Hyderabad while 22 passengers were to go to Karachi.

References

2022 in Pakistan
August 2022 events in Pakistan
2022 disasters in Pakistan
Bus incidents in Pakistan
2022 road incidents
2022 in Punjab, Pakistan
2020s road incidents in Asia